The 1936 Delaware State Hornets football team represented the State College for Colored Students—now known as Delaware State University—in the 1936 college football season. In their third and final season as a member of the Middle Atlantic Athletic Association, Delaware State posted a 2–4 record under coach Butler.

Schedule

Notes

References

Delaware State
Delaware State Hornets football seasons
Delaware State Hornets football